Victor Muller (born 2 January 1973 in Argentina) is an Argentinean retired footballer.

References

Argentine footballers
Living people
Association football forwards
1973 births
Newell's Old Boys footballers
Club Atlético Vélez Sarsfield footballers
Club Atlético Patronato footballers